Low Water or Low Waters may refer to:

Low water, or low tide, when the water of a tide stops falling
Low Water or Season of the Harvest, the third and final season of lunar and civil Egyptian calendars
Low Water (band), an American rock band
Low Waters, Hamilton, a place in Scotland

See also